Zakaria Eddahchouri (born 11 May 2000) is a Dutch footballer who plays as an attacking midfielder or right winger for Tweede Divisie club Koninklijke HFC.

Career
Having made his debut for the club on 3 May 2019 in a 2–0 Eerste Divisie defeat at FC Den Bosch, he signed a three-year contract with Go Ahead Eagles in July 2019.

Personal life
Born in the Netherlands, Eddahchouri is of Moroccan descent.

Career statistics

References

External links
 Career stats & profile - Voetbal International
 
 

2000 births
21st-century Dutch people
Dutch sportspeople of Moroccan descent
People from Papendrecht
Footballers from South Holland
Living people
Dutch footballers
Association football midfielders
Association football wingers
Go Ahead Eagles players
Koninklijke HFC players
Eredivisie players
Eerste Divisie players
Tweede Divisie players